Matej Hliničan (born 21 September 1994) is a Slovak male badminton player. In 2014, he won the Ethiopia International tournament in the mixed doubles event partnered with Bridget Shamim Bangi of Ethiopia, and became the runner-up in the men's doubles event with Arnaud Genin of French. In December 2014, he and Bangi became the runner-up at the Botswana International tournament, they were defeated by the South African pair in the final round. In 2015, he teamed-up with Jan Fröhlich in the men's doubles event, and they became the runner-up at the Puerto Rico International tournament.

Achievements

BWF International Challenge/Series
Men's doubles

Mixed doubles

 BWF International Challenge tournament
 BWF International Series tournament
 BWF Future Series tournament

References

External links
 

Living people
1993 births
Sportspeople from Trenčín
Slovak male badminton players